The Ayyubid watchtower is a stone tower dating back to the Ayyubid period (c. 1170-1250), more specifically in the year 1220, on the southern wall of the Amman Citadel in the center of the Jordanian capital, Amman. It is located in an area adjacent to the much older Temple of Hercules. It also contains traces of other civilizations that have succeeded in the city for thousands of years.

Description
The Ayyubids, who excelled in military architecture, constructed this tower for observation, as it overlooks the center of Amman. It consists of a small room of 9.45 m in length and 7.55 m in width. There are openings in three of its walls for shooting arrows. The fourth wall has, built into its width, a staircase leading to the roof. Blocks of cylindrical columns, which used to be a part of the Roman temple of Hercules, were used on the southern façade.

It is noteworthy that the Jordanian Ministry of Tourism and Antiquities restored the building in the early 1990s, and turned to its present form.

History

Crusader presence on the Citadel Hill during the Kingdom of Jerusalem is so far based only on interpretations of Crusader sources. William of Tyre writes that in 1161 Philip of Milly received the castle of "Ahamant", seen to refer to Amman, as part of the lordship of Oultrejordain. In 1166 Philip joined the Knights Templar, passing on to them a large part of his fief, including the castle of Ahamant or "Haman", as it is named in a deed of confirmation. By 1170, Amman was in Ayyubid hands. The remains of the watch tower on Citadel Hill were at first attributed to the Crusaders, but are now preferentially dated to the Ayyubid period, leaving it to further research to find the location of the Crusader castle.

References

Archaeological sites in Jordan
Buildings and structures in Amman
13th-century establishments
1220